Julia Dahmen (born 2 April 1978 in Hamburg, West Germany) is a German television actress. She is most noted for her role as Constanze Riemer in the soap opera Marienhof, and her role as Leonora Lopez in Storm of Love.

She is the daughter of the actors Karlheinz Lemken and Andrea Dahmen.

External links

Personal Site 
UnitOne Agency Gauting-Königswiesen 

German television actresses
Actresses from Hamburg
1977 births
Living people